The CAC Next 20 is an index of security prices used with the Euronext Paris or Euronext Amsterdam.  It gathers the 20 companies whose market capitalizations are ranked after those of the 40 companies who compose the CAC 40.  These 20 are possible candidates to replace the members of the CAC 40 index. The CAC Next 20 was launched on 31 December 2002.  Like the CAC 40, this new index is calculated uninterruptedly every 30 seconds.

Composition
The following is the list of the CAC Next 20 companies as of 5 November 2021.

See also

 CAC 40
 CAC Mid 60
 List of companies of France

References

External links 
 Official Euronext CAC Next 20 page

 
French stock market indices
Lists of companies of France